John Valentine Stevens (13 March 1852 – 14 August 1925) was a British trade unionist and Lib-Lab politician.

Born in Bristol, Stevens completed an apprenticeship as a tinplate worker before moving to Birmingham.  In 1874, he joined the Amalgamated Tin Plate Workers of Birmingham, Wolverhampton and District, and was elected as its president in 1880, and then as Secretary in 1886.  In this role, he persuaded the various local associations of tinplate workers to unite, forming the National Amalgamated Association of Tin-Plate Workers in 1894.  He was elected Secretary of the new union, dominating it until his retirement in 1919.

Stevens was elected to Birmingham City Council on its formation in 1889, defeating Austen Chamberlain, retaining his seat as a Liberal-Labour member until 1907.  At the 1900 general election, he stood in Birmingham East, but lost heavily, and was again defeated in December 1910.

In 1897, the annual Trades Union Congress was held in Birmingham, and Stevens served as its President.  He also held various prominent roles on the Birmingham Trades Council, was the first President of the National Committee of Organised Labour for Promoting Old Age Pensions for All, and was prominent in the Ancient Order of Foresters.

References

1852 births
1925 deaths
Councillors in Birmingham, West Midlands
British trade union leaders
Liberal-Labour (UK) politicians
Trade unionists from Bristol
Presidents of the Trades Union Congress